Professor Michael O'Flaherty is the current (September 2015) Director of the European Union Fundamental Rights Agency (FRA). The FRA is the EU's human rights advisory body, based in Vienna, Austria. An Irish human rights lawyer, O’Flaherty was a member from 2004 to 2012 of the United Nations Human Rights Committee (HRC), the expert body that oversees compliance with the International Covenant on Civil and Political Rights (ICCPR). Again nominated by Ireland in 2008, O'Flaherty was re-elected to the HRC with the highest number of votes (136 states) achieved by any candidate. On 19 September 2011 he took up appointment as the third Chief Commissioner of the Northern Ireland Human Rights Commission (NIHRC), the statutory national human rights institution for Northern Ireland. He resigned as chief commissioner in October 2013.

A native of Salthill in Galway, and the son and grandson of mayors of Galway, O'Flaherty attended school at Scoil Iognaid Gaillimh, Willow Park Preparatory School and Blackrock College, Dublin. He holds degrees in law from University College Dublin, in theology and philosophy from the Pontifical Gregorian University in Rome, and in international relations from the University of Amsterdam. Ordained in the 1980s as a priest in the Roman Catholic Church for the Diocese of Galway, he has not exercised priestly ministry since 1992. He has since been laicised.

In November 2019, on the basis of his published works in the field of human rights, Michael O’Flaherty was awarded the Higher Doctorate in Laws (LLD) by the National University of Ireland

Qualified as a solicitor in Ireland, he does not practice in the courts. Since completing his postgraduate studies he has worked mainly in the field of international human rights. From 2004 to 2012 he was Professor of Applied Human Rights and Co-Director of the Human Rights Law Centre at the University of Nottingham, England. In December 2012 he was appointed as Established Professor of Human Rights at the National University of Ireland, Galway and Director of the Irish Centre for Human Rights.

Having written extensively on the ICCPR in the 1990s, O'Flaherty joined the United Nations civil service and held several headquarters and field positions in the Office of the High Commissioner for Human Rights (OHCHR). This included co-ordination of the OHCHR Asia and the Pacific programmes, leadership of field operations in Sierra Leone and Bosnia and Herzegovina, and (2000–02) chairing the UN reference group on human rights and humanitarian action. He served for some years as secretary to the Committee on the Elimination of Racial Discrimination, and as a senior researcher in Florence at the UNICEF child rights research unit, the Innocenti Research Centre. He was a member of the UN Expert Group on Human Rights Indicators, and has been an advisor to several intergovernmental and international non-governmental organisations, including the European Roma Rights Centre and the Council of the European Inter-University Centre for Human Rights and Democratisation.

According to a CV posted on the European Parliament (LIBE committee) website in 2014, O’Flaherty had at that date published 9 books and some 55 articles and other writings, all in the field of human rights. He was 'rapporteur' (principal drafter) for the Human Rights Committee's General Comment on Article 19 of ICCPR, finally adopted on 21 July 2011 after two years of negotiation. This major re-statement of the international law on freedom of expression emphasises the importance of media freedoms and it sets out the extent to which human rights standards relate to the new media and information platforms. O'Flaherty also has contributed to the international definition and protection of gay rights: in 2006 he led the drafting of the Yogyakarta Principles on the Application of International Human Rights Law in relation to Sexual Orientation and Gender Identity.

O'Flaherty is former Chairperson of the Irish Penal Reform Trust and the former Vice-Chair of the Universal Rights Group. In September 2015 it was announced that he was appointed as Director of the European Union Fundamental Rights Agency.  The FRA “delivers on its responsibility as the acknowledged, unique and independent centre of reference and excellence for the promotion and protection of the rights of everyone in the European Union”. In a speech delivered in Warsaw, Poland, on 1 December 2017, he described its activities, “(FRA) is the body tasked with delivering independent data, analysis and advice to the EU institutions, as well as its Member States, to support them in being compliant with the fundamental rights standards of the Union. From our base in Vienna, we do our work through the undertaking of surveys, analysis of pressing human rights challenges - including by giving voice to rights-holders - delivery of legal opinions and support for the embedding of a culture of human and fundamental rights, also at the local level across EU Member States”.

In a 2015 newspaper article he described his period of work in the field:

"Documenting wartime human rights violations used to be my job. Over a good few years, working for the United Nations, I witnessed the most appalling acts of cruelty and inhumanity. Often I arrived on a scene to find mutilated bodies, wounded or deeply traumatised survivors and smouldering buildings.

A few times I was a direct witness to atrocity, like the summary execution of “rebels” in the streets of Freetown, the capital of Sierra Leone. In that country the perpetrators were sometimes just teenagers, many of whom had themselves been abducted years beforehand. I used to speak with these kids, who were often armed to the teeth and high on drugs, to try to persuade them to release kidnapped children. 
More than once I came close to being killed, sometimes by being in the wrong place at the wrong time but more often for such stupid reasons as driving a faulty jeep or begging a lift on an ancient helicopter.

My main job was to chronicle what was going on, frame it in terms of the relevant international human-rights law and get the reports up the line to UN decisionmakers in New York and Geneva. The work sometimes seemed futile, even cruel, fuelling false expectations among people who co-operated with us.

Often it felt as if no one cared. My own boss when I worked in Bosnia, the former prime minister of Poland Tadeusz Mazowiecki, resigned in protest at the ignoring of his warning about the imminent massacre at Srebrenica. I never quit, but I did have moments of near despair. I recall sitting in tears on a veranda in Freetown, listening to the worsening artillery fire in nearby hills at a moment when the world seemed to have interest in only one conflict: the one far away in Kosovo.

What kept my colleagues and I going were the small achievements: protecting some people simply because of our presence, improving conditions in detention facilities, helping to ensure that food and aid were distributed equitably, seeking to keep the situation of innocent victims of war to the forefront of peacemakers’ attention.

The chronicling also had its successes, especially for the delivery of postconflict justice. It was very satisfying for me many years later to present my reports and give evidence at the trials in which the Liberian president Charles Taylor and others were convicted of crimes against humanity."

References

External links 
 Northern Ireland Human Rights Commission
 Human Rights Law Centre, University of Nottingham
 Yogyakarta Principles website

Alumni of University College Dublin
Irish officials of the European Union
United Nations Human Rights Committee members
Irish legal scholars
Living people
20th-century Irish lawyers
21st-century Irish lawyers
Irish officials of the United Nations
Year of birth missing (living people)